Jumayl (Al Jamīl, El Gemil and Aljmail) ( Favor) is a town in central Nuqat al Khams District of western Libya. , Jumayl had an estimated population of 102,000.

Notes

External links
 "Al Jumayl Map — Satellite Images of Al Jumayl" Maplandia World Gazetteer
 "الجميل" photograph of Al Jamil from Panoramio

Populated places in Nuqat al Khams District
Tripolitania
Baladiyat of Libya